Elections were held in the state of Western Australia on 10 February 2001 to elect all 57 members to the Legislative Assembly and all 34 members to the Legislative Council. The two-term Liberal–National coalition government, led by Premier Richard Court, was defeated by the Labor Party, led by Opposition Leader Dr Geoff Gallop.

The election produced the biggest change of seats at any election since 1911, with Labor winning 14 seats from the Coalition as well as an Independent-held seat, while losing the seat of Kalgoorlie for the first time since 1923 to Liberal candidate Matt Birney. Meanwhile, a minister in the outgoing Government, Doug Shave, lost his seat of Alfred Cove to Independent candidate Dr Janet Woollard, who was also a member of the Liberals for Forests party.

This was the first election in Western Australian history where the Australian Greens Party overtook the National Party in its share of the state vote.

Results

Legislative Assembly

|}

Notes:
 At the 1996 election, Labor Party member Larry Graham won the Pilbara seat. He resigned from the party during the term of parliament, and won his seat as an independent in 2001. The retirement of Labor independent Ernie Bridge, whose seat of Kimberley was subsequently won at the election by Labor candidate Carol Martin, and Woollard's defeat of Shave in Alfred Cove kept the numbers of Independents at four.

Legislative Council

|}

Notes:
 At the 1996 election, the Liberals and Nationals ran a combined ticket in two regions, ran separately in a third, and the Liberals ran alone in the remaining three. The two parties received a combined vote of 46.45%. As such, the swing against the Coalition in the Legislative Council was 10.09%.

Seats changing hands

 Members listed in italics did not contest their seat at this election.

Post-election pendulum

See also
 Candidates of the 2001 Western Australian state election
 Members of the Western Australian Legislative Assembly, 1996–2001
 Members of the Western Australian Legislative Assembly, 2001–2005

References

Elections in Western Australia
2001 elections in Australia
2000s in Western Australia
February 2001 events in Australia